My World is a studio album by Swedish singer Emilia Rydberg, released on 23 September 2009.

Track listing
"Teardrops" - 3:34
"You're My World" - 2:53
"I'll Get Over You" - 3:35
"Coming Home" - 2:51
"Two Roads" - 3:22
"The Story" - 3:45
"Stars" - 3:21
"Song 4 You" - 3:17
"Doesn't Get Better" - 3:42
"Right Side of Life" - 3:29
"Luckily" - 4:19

References 

2009 albums
Emilia Rydberg albums